The Chief of Staff of the Eritrean Defence Forces. The person in this post is the highest-ranking military officer in the EDF and is responsible for maintaining operational control over military structures.

List

References 

Chiefs of defence
Military of Eritrea